Cafe Mascot is a 1936 British comedy film directed by Lawrence Huntington and starring Geraldine Fitzgerald. It was produced by Gabriel Pascal, and made at Wembley Studios.

A young man discovers £1,000 in a taxi. The kindly man gives it to an impoverished Irish girl (Geraldine Fitzgerald) by investing it in her cafe, The Cafe Mascot.

Cast
 Geraldine Fitzgerald as Moira O'Flynn  
 Derrick De Marney as Jerry Wilson 
 George Mozart as George Juppley  
 Clifford Heatherley as Dudhope  
 Richard Norris as Nat Dawson  
 Paul Neville as Peters  
 Julian Vedey as Francois  
 George Turner as Miles  
 Geoffrey Clark as Benton

External links
 

1936 films
1936 comedy films
British black-and-white films
British comedy films
Films directed by Lawrence Huntington
Films produced by Gabriel Pascal
Films shot at Wembley Studios
1930s English-language films
1930s British films